KBSF may refer to:

 KBSF-LP, a low-power radio station (100.7 FM) licensed to serve Portland, Oregon, United States
 KTKC (AM), a radio station (1460 AM) licensed to Springhill, Louisiana, United States, which held the call sign KBSF until 2010